In the Heliopolis Flat ( Fi shaket Masr El Gedeeda) is a 2007 Egyptian film directed by Mohamed Khan. It was Egypt's submission to the 80th Academy Awards for the Academy Award for Best Foreign Language Film, but was not accepted as a nominee.

Cast
 Ghada Adel as Najwa
 Kal Naga as Yehya
 Aida Riyad as Hayat
 Ahmed Rateb as Eid
 Youssef Dawoud as Shafiq
 Marwa Hussain as Dalia
 Daunia Massoud as Marwa

See also
List of submissions to the 80th Academy Awards for Best Foreign Language Film

References

External links

2007 films
Egyptian romantic drama films
Films directed by Mohamed Khan